The 1950 All-Ireland Senior Camogie Championship Final was the nineteenth All-Ireland Final and the deciding match of the 1950 All-Ireland Senior Camogie Championship, an inter-county camogie tournament for the top teams in Ireland.

Dublin had beaten Antrim 6-5 to 4-1 in the "Home" final, and went to London for the All-Ireland final on Easter Monday 1951. They led 4-2 to 0-0 at half-time and won easily. P. Cooney scored three goals. This is the last All-Ireland final to date not to be held at Croke Park.

References

All-Ireland Senior Camogie Championship Finals
All-Ireland Senior Camogie Championship Final
All-Ireland Senior Camogie Championship Final
All-Ireland Senior Camogie Championship Final
All-Ireland Senior Camogie Championship Final
Dublin county camogie team matches